Winchester Town Hall may refer to:

Winchester Town Hall (Massachusetts), listed on the US National Register of Historic Places (NRHP)
Winchester Town Hall (New Hampshire), NRHP-listed

See also
Winchester Guildhall, Hampshire, England